This is a list of operas specifically written for television performance.

{| class="wikitable sortable"
!style="width:55px;"|Year of premiere!!style="width:55px;"|Com­posed!!Composer!!Opera title!!Librettist and/or source(s)!!Television station
|-
| 1938 || ||  Spike Hughes || Cinderella ||  Spike Hughes || BBC Television
|-
| 1947 || ||  Spike Hughes ||  St Patrick's Day ||  Richard Brinsley Sheridan || BBC Television
|-
| 1951 || ||  Gian Carlo Menotti || Amahl and the Night Visitors ||  Gian Carlo Menotti || NBC
|-
| 1952 || ||  Malcolm Arnold ||  The Dancing Master ||  Joe Mendoza, based on the play by William Wycherley || BBC (rejected)
|-
| 1953 || ||  Bohuslav Martinů ||  The Marriage ||  Bohuslav Martinů || NBC
|-
| 1953 || ||  Bohuslav Martinů ||  What Men Live By ||  Bohuslav Martinů || NBC
|-
| 1954 || ||  Bernard Herrmann ||  A Christmas Carol ||  Maxwell Anderson after Charles Dickens || CBS
|-
| 1955 || ||  Lukas Foss || Griffelkin ||  Alastair Reid|| NBC
|-
| 1955 || ||  Walter Kaufmann || Christmas Slippers ||  Betty Marsh|| Winnipeg
|-
| 1956 || ||  Norman Dello Joio ||  The Trial at Rouen ||  Norman Dello Joio|| NBC
|-
| 1956 || ||  Leonard Kastle ||  The Swing ||  Leonard Kastle|| NBC
|-
| 1956 || ||  Arthur Benjamin ||  Mañana ||  Caryl Brahms || BBC Television
|-
| 1956 || ||  Malcolm Arnold ||  The Open Window ||  Sidney Gilliat || BBC Television
|-
| 1957 || ||  Joan Trimble || Blind Raftery ||  Cedric Cliffe, based on the novel by Donn-Byrne|| BBC Television
|-
| 1957 || ||  Stanley Hollingsworth ||  La Grande Bretèche ||  Stanley Hollingsworth|| NBC
|-
| 1959 || ||  Richard Arnell ||  The Petrified Princess ||  Richard Arnell|| BBC Television
|-
| 1959 || ||  Guy Halahan ||  The Spur of the Moment|| Joe Mendoza, after Frank Baker, Miss Hargreaves|| BBC Television
|-
| 1959 || ||  Gian Carlo Menotti || Maria Golovin ||  Gian Carlo Menotti || NBC
|-
| 1959 || ||  Lee Hoiby || Beatrice ||  Marci Nardi || WAVE
|-
| 1959 || ||  Ezra Laderman || Sarah ||  Clair Rascom|| CBS
|-
| 1959 || ||  Heinrich Sutermeister || Seraphine (Die stümme Apothekerin) ||  Heinrich Sutermeister, after François Rabelais's Gargantua and Pantagruel || Schweizer Fernsehen
|-
| 1959 || ||  Henk Badings || Salto mortale ||  Henk Badings and Belcampo (Herman Pieter Schönfeld Wichers) || Nederlandse Omroep Stichting
|-
| 1959 || ||  Paul Angerer || Passkontrolle || || ORF
|-
| 1960 || ||  Arthur Bliss || Tobias and the Angel ||  Christopher Hassall || BBC Television
|-
| 1961 || ||  Leonard Kastle || Deseret ||  Anne Howard Bailey|| NBC
|-
| 1961 || ||  Jean Prodromidès ||  Les Perses (The Persians) ||  Jean Prat, after Aeschylus || RTF
|-
| 1962 || ||  Igor Stravinsky ||  The Flood ||  Robert Craft|| CBS
|-
| 1962 || ||  Phyllis Tate || Dark Pilgrimage ||  Phyllis Tate|| BBC Television
|-
| 1962 || ||  Edwin Coleman ||  A Christmas Carol||  Margaret Burns Harris, after Charles Dickens|| BBC Television
|-
| 1962 || ||  Riccardo Malipiero || Battono alla porta ||  Dino Buzzati|| RAI
|-
| 1963 || ||  Ben McPeek ||  The Bargain ||  Ben McPeek || CBC Television
|-
| 1963 || ||  Gian Carlo Menotti || Labyrinth ||  Gian Carlo Menotti || NBC
|-
| 1963 || ||  Carlisle Floyd ||  The Sojourner and Mollie Sinclair ||  Carlisle Floyd || NCE
|-
| 1963 || ||  Ton de Leeuw || Alceste || Euripides || Nederlandse Omroep Stichting
|-
| 1964 || ||  Heinrich Sutermeister ||  Das Gespenst von Canterville ||  Heinrich Sutermeister, after Oscar Wilde's "The Canterville Ghost" || Mainz, ZDF
|-
| 1965 || ||  David Amram ||  The Final Ingredient ||  Arnold Weinstein|| ABC
|-
| 1965 || ||  Mark Bucci ||  The Hero ||  Mark Bucci|| National Educational Television
|-
| 1965 || ||  Carl Davis ||  The Arrangement||  || BBC Television
|-
| 1965 || ||  Gian Carlo Menotti || Martin's Lie ||  Gian Carlo Menotti || CBS
|-
| 1966 || ||  R. Murray Schafer || Loving ||  R. Murray Schafer|| CBC Television
|-
| 1967 || ||  Ezra Laderman ||  The Trials of Galileo ||  Joe Darion|| CBS Television
|-
| 1967 || ||  Ingvar Lidholm || Holländaren (The Dutchman) || after August Strindberg || Sveriges Television
|-
| 1967 || ||  Christopher Whelen || Some Place of Darkness||  John Hopkins || BBC Television
|-
| 1968 || ||  Roman Vlad ||  || Giuseppe Berto's  (1965) || RAI
|-
| 1968 || ||  Norman Kay || The Rose Affair || After the novel by Alun Owen || BBC Television
|-
| 1969 || ||  Thomas Eastwood || The Rebel ||  Ronald Duncan || BBC Television
|-
| 1969 || ||  Heinrich Sutermeister ||  La croisade des enfants (The Children's Crusade) ||  Heinrich Sutermeister, after Marcel Schwob || TvR
|-
| 1970 || ||  Jack Beeson || My Heart's in the Highlands ||  Jack Beeson|| PBS
|-
| 1971 || ||  Heinrich Sutermeister || Das Flaschenteufel ||  Kurt Weibel, after Robert Louis Stevenson's The Bottle Imp || Mainz, ZDF
|-
| 1971 || 1969–70 ||  Benjamin Britten || Owen Wingrave ||  Myfanwy Piper, after Henry James || BBC Two
|-
| 1971 || ||  Ezra Laderman || And David Wept ||  Joe Darion, after the Biblical story of David and Bathsheba || CBS Television
|-
|1973|| ||John Eaton||Myshkin|||Patrick Creagh after Dostoevsky's The Idiot||PBS
|-
| 1976|| ||  Alun Hoddinott ||  Murder, The Magician ||  John Morgan || HTV
|-
| 1976 || ||  Godfrey Ridout ||  The Lost Child ||  John Reid || CBC Television
|-
| 1976 || ||  Raymond Pannell || Aberfan ||  Beverly Pannell || CBC Television
|-
| 1977 || ||  Carl Davis || Orpheus in the Underworld ||  John Wells || BBC Television
|-
| 1979 || ||  Alun Hoddinott ||  The Rajah's Diamond ||  Myfanwy Piper, from R. L. Stevenson's New Arabian Nights || BBC Television
|-
| 1984 || ||  Robert Ashley || Perfect Lives ||  Robert Ashley || Channel Four
|-
| 1990 || ||  Salvador Brotons || Reverend Everyman ||  Gary Corseri, from Hofmannsthal's Jedermann || WFSU-TV
|-
| 1991 || ||  Michael Nyman || Letters, Riddles and Writs ||  Jeremy Newson and Pat Gavin || BBC Television
|-
| 1993 || ||  Stewart Copeland || Horse Opera ||  Jonathan Moore || Channel Four
|-
| 1993 || ||  Anthony Moore || Camera' ||  Peter Blegvad || Channel Four
|-
| 1994 || 1991–92 ||  Gerald Barry ||  The Triumph of Beauty and Deceit ||  Meredith Oakes || Channel Four
|-
| 1994 || 1992 ||  Orlando Gough ||  The Empress ||  David Gale, from Wedekind || Channel Four
|-
| 1995 || 1993 ||  Michael Torke ||  King of Hearts ||  Christopher Rawlence || Channel Four
|-
| 1995 || ||  Mike Westbrook Kate Westbrook ||  Good Friday, 1663 ||  Helen Simpson || Channel Four
|-
| 2005 || ||  Judith Weir || Armida ||  Judith Weir || Channel Four
|-
| 2006 || ||  Jonathan Dove || Man on the Moon ||  Nicholas Wright || Channel Four
|-
| 2006 || ||  Alexina Louie || Burnt Toast: 8 Mini Comic Operas About Love ||  Dan Redican || CBC Television
|-
| 2015 || ||  Elena Kats-Chernin ||  The Divorce ||  Joanna Murray-Smith || ABC TV (Australia)
|}

See also
 List of radio operas
 Radio opera

References

Further reading
 
 
 
 
 "Television's audience for opera", The Guardian'', 8 December 1966, p. 8.

 
Television